Phil Barnhart (born 1946) is an American politician and psychologist from the state of Oregon. He was a Democratic member of the Oregon House of Representatives, representing District 11 from 2003 to 2019 and District 40 from 2001 to 2003.

Early life and education 
Barnhart was born in New Rochelle, New York and raised in Eugene, Oregon, where he graduated from South Eugene High School. He earned a Bachelor of Arts degree from the University of Oregon, a Juris Doctor from the University of Oregon School of Law, and a PhD in psychology from the California School of Professional Psychology.

Career 
Prior to entering politics, Barnhart worked as a psychologist and adjunct professor at the University of Oregon. He was elected to the Oregon House of Representatives in 2001 and assumed office in 2001. After serving one term, Barnhart's district was redrawn. He represented the 11th district from 2003 until his retirement in 2019.

References

External links
Oregon State House - Phil Barnhart
Project Vote Smart - Representative Phil Barnhart (OR) profile

1946 births
Living people
Members of the Oregon House of Representatives
Politicians from New Rochelle, New York
Politicians from Eugene, Oregon
University of Oregon alumni
Oregon lawyers
South Eugene High School alumni
21st-century American politicians
California School of Professional Psychology alumni